Bardley is an unincorporated community on the Oregon/Ripley county line in the U.S. state of Missouri. It is located on Missouri Route J approximately two miles north of U.S. Route 160 and fourteen miles east of Alton.

History
Bardley had its start in 1895 as a logging town. The community was named after Bordley, Kentucky, the native home of a first settler (a postal error accounts for the error in spelling, which was never corrected). A post office called Bardley was established in 1895, and remained in operation until 1966.

References

Unincorporated communities in Ripley County, Missouri
Unincorporated communities in Oregon County, Missouri
Unincorporated communities in Missouri